Kevin Nugent (born June 7, 1955) is an American former professional ice hockey player.

Early life 
Nugent was born in Little Falls, Minnesota, and raised in Edina. At the age of 14, he captained the first team in the state to win the USA national bantam championship in hockey. He attended Hill-Murray School, where captained its team in his junior and senior years. Nugent was a member of the Notre Dame Fighting Irish men's ice hockey team from 1974 to 1978. He played in 131 games, in which he was credited with 54 goals and 75 assists.

Career 
Nugent played for the Indianapolis Racers, in the World Hockey Association where, during the 1978–'79 season, he was the first linemate that Wayne Gretzky had in professional hockey.

Personal life 
As of 2008, Nugent resides in Connecticut with his wife and four children, of whom Kevin, Jr. played a season for the Tri-City Storm of the USHL and became a forward on the Notre Dame 2009–2010 freshman squad.

References

External links

1955 births
Living people
People from Little Falls, Minnesota
American men's ice hockey right wingers
Boston Bruins draft picks
Dallas Black Hawks players
Ice hockey players from Minnesota
Sportspeople from Edina, Minnesota
Indianapolis Racers players
Notre Dame Fighting Irish men's ice hockey players